Leucine zipper, putative tumor suppressor family member 3 is a protein in humans that is encoded by the LZTS3 gene.

References

Further reading